The 120 members of the tenth Knesset were elected on 30 June 1981. The breakdown by party was as follows:
Likud: 48
Alignment: 47
National Religious Party: 6
Agudat Yisrael: 4
Hadash: 4
Tehiya: 3
Tami: 3
Telem: 2
Shinui: 2
Ratz: 1

List of members

Replacements

External links
Members of the Tenth Knesset Knesset website

 
10